Luis Bush is an Argentina-born Christian missionary and the president of the Transform World Connections.

Early life
Bush was born in Argentina, but was raised in Brazil. In 1970 he graduated from the University of North Carolina in Chapel Hill, N.C. in economics and worked in Business Consulting for an Arthur Andersen Consulting in Chicago before deciding in 1973 to devote his life to Christian ministry. He graduated from theological seminary in 1978.

Ministry 
In 1978, he traveled to San Salvador, along with his wife Doris, to serve at the Iglesia Nazaret as senior pastor.  Bush led the movement of missions called COMIBAM from Latin America during its initial phase and later served as CEO of Partners International from 1986 to 1992, an organization that seeks to grow communities of Christian witnesses in largely non-Christian areas by partnering with indigenous Christian ministries. He served as the international director of the AD2000 & Beyond Movement from 1989-2001.

The 10/40 Window & Transform World
He and his wife Doris coined the term 10/40 Window which focused on the region of the world with least exposure to Christianity. Transform World was the name given to the first global event in Indonesia in 2005 when Luis was asked to serve as international facilitator for other related events processes.

4/14 Window 
Luis Bush also champions the term 4/14 Window which is a child evangelism movement term. The 4/14 Window is a global Christian mission movement focused on delivering children between the ages of 4 and 14 years old from oppression, deception, depression and destruction.

Later studies
Bush completed a PhD in Intercultural Studies from Fuller Theological Seminary School of Intercultural Studies in 2003. The study of catalytic antecedents of today’s mission led to a World Inquiry conducted from 2002 to 2004 involving participants from more than 700 cities.

References

External links
 Luis Bush Papers 
 The 10/40 Window by Luis Bush 
 AD2000 & Beyond Movement
 Transform World 2020
 4/14 Window

Year of birth missing (living people)
Living people
American Protestant missionaries
University of North Carolina at Chapel Hill alumni
American expatriates in El Salvador
Protestant missionaries in El Salvador
Argentine emigrants to the United States